Kodiak is a half-hour adventure program (produced by Warner Bros. TV) that aired Friday evenings at 8:00 p.m Eastern time on ABC during the 1974-1975 television season. The show filled the time spot left vacant by ABC's cancellation of The Brady Bunch.

The show revolved around the main character of Cal "Kodiak" McKay (played by Clint Walker), an Alaska State Trooper. Kodiak, always accompanied by his Eskimo sidekick Abraham Lincoln Imhook, used his four-wheel drive truck to track down desperate killers through 50,000 miles of Alaska backcountry.

The show received unfavorable reviews from critics like John J. O'Connor who called it a "disaster" and wrote that its premiere episode was "about as interesting as watching a large block of polluted ice." It suffered low ratings due to being scheduled opposite NBC's mega-hit Sanford and Son. Kodiak was cancelled after the first episode, although a total of four episodes were aired. The show was filmed in Bend, Oregon, using the Old Skyliners Ski Lodge as the primary meeting place.

Abner Biberman portrayed Imhook, and Maggie Blye had the role of police radio dispatcher Mandy.

The program was created by Stan Shpetner and Anthony Lawrence; Shpetner was the producer.

Episodes

References

External links

1974 American television series debuts
1974 American television series endings
American Broadcasting Company original programming
1970s American crime drama television series
Television series by Warner Bros. Television Studios
Television shows set in Alaska
English-language television shows